The Oppo F17 Pro is a phone developed by Oppo. It is the latest phone in the Oppo F Series, a range of devices marketed towards consumers looking a mid-range phone. The phone was released in India on September 7, 2020, and later went on the market in other countries by a different name, the Oppo A93. The phone has a single configuration with a price of ₹22990, but there is also a special "Diwali Edition" version of the phone, which features a Matte Gold version of the phone, which is boxed along with a 10000mAh power bank and a "Diwali Exclusive back case cover." This special edition sells for ₹23990.

References 

Oppo F17 Pro Full Specifications and Price in BD

External links 
 Official website
Oppo F17 Pro In Bangladesh

Oppo smartphones
Mobile phones introduced in 2020
Mobile phones with 4K video recording
Mobile phones with multiple rear cameras